The Abu Dhabi Championship, is a horse race for horses aged four and over, run at a distance of 2,200 metres (eleven furlongs) on turf in March at Abu Dhabi Equestrian Club in Abu Dhabi.

The Abu Dhabi Championship was first contested in 2004 and became a Listed race in 2005 before being elevated to Group 3 class in 2011.  The race reverted to Listed race again in 2022.

Records
Record time:
 2:12.70 - Jamr 2014

Most successful horse:
 2 - GM Hopkins 2019, 2020

Most wins by a jockey:

 3 - Pat Cosgrave 2011, 2019, 2020
 3 - Richard Hills 2005, 2007, 2010

Most wins by a trainer:
 3 - Dhruba Selvaratnam 2006, 2008, 2015
 3 - Ali Rashid Al Rayhi 2010, 2012, 2016
 3 - Erwan Charpy 2004, 2007, 2017

Most wins by an owner:
 5 - Hamdan Al Maktoum 2005, 2007, 2010, 2016, 2017

Winners

See also
 List of United Arab Emirates horse races

References

Horse races in the United Arab Emirates
Recurring sporting events established in 2004
2004 establishments in the United Arab Emirates